"Need You" is a 1967 single by Sonny James.  The single went to number one on the Billboard Hot Country Singles chart where it spent two weeks at the top.  "Need You" spent a total of seventeen weeks on the chart.

"Need You" is known as the song that began a string of 16 consecutive single releases that reached No. 1 on the Billboard Hot Country Singles chart without a miss. The string would continue into 1971, capped by the song "Here Comes Honey Again," the string finally being broken in 1972 with "Only Love Can Break a Heart." The string of 16 consecutive (non-holiday) single releases would be surpassed in 1985 by the country supergroup Alabama; the band would go on to have 21 No. 1 songs in a row, and to date is the only act to match James' record.

Chart performance

References

1967 singles
Sonny James songs
Capitol Records singles
1967 songs